AD 63 (LXIII) was a common year starting on Saturday (link will display the full calendar) of the Julian calendar. At the time, it was known as the Year of the Consulship of Regulus and Rufus (or, less frequently, year 816 Ab urbe condita). The denomination AD 63 for this year has been used since the early medieval period, when the Anno Domini calendar era became the prevalent method in Europe for naming years.

Events

By place

Roman Empire 
 Vespasian becomes governor of Africa.
 Gnaeus Domitius Corbulo is restored to command after the Roman debacle at the Battle of Rhandeia. He invades Armenia and defeats Tiridates I, who accepts Roman sovereignty. Parthia withdraws from the war.
 Pompeii, the city at the foot of Mount Vesuvius, is heavily damaged by a strong earthquake. Fearing new earthquakes, many of the 20,000 inhabitants leave their homes in a panicked flight.

By topic

Religion 
 According to legend, Joseph of Arimathea goes to Glastonbury on the first Christian mission to Britain.
 Paul is possibly in Spain.

Arts and sciences 
 Aulus Cornelius Celsus writes a dictionary (encyclopedia) on the arts and sciences.

Births 
 Dou, Chinese empress of the Han Dynasty (d. AD 97)

Deaths 
 Claudia Augusta, daughter of Nero
 Mark the Evangelist (traditional date) (see AD 61)

References 

0063